Dangerous Waters may refer to:

 Dangerous Waters (video game)
 Dangerous Waters (1936 film), American film
 Dangerous Waters (1995 film), Norwegian film
 Dangerous Waters (upcoming film)